Savalia lucifica, commonly known as the luminescent parazoanthid, is a form of false black coral in the family Parazoanthidae. This zoanthid exhibits bioluminescence.

Distribution 
Savalia lucifica was first described by Cutress & Pequegnat in 1960. This vessel was undertaking exploration and research into the deepwater red coral populations of the Aegean Sea at the time.

Ecology 
Savalia lucifica emits light when stimulated, for example when stroked gently by a finger. In the Mediterranean Sea, this zoanthid  uses the deepwater gorgonian Callogorgia verticillata as a substrate.

References 

Invertebrates of Europe
Animals described in 1960
Parazoanthidae
Bioluminescent cnidarians